Iago Pereira Mendonça (born 16 August 1999), known as Iago Mendonça or simply Iago, is a Brazilian professional footballer who plays as a central defender for Goiás.

Club career
Born in Barreiras, Bahia, Iago Mendonça represented Atlético Goianiense, Jardim América and Trindade as a youth. He made his senior debut with the latter on 11 June 2017, playing the last six minutes of a 1–0 Campeonato Goiano Segunda Divisão away win against ASEEV.

Iago Mendonça moved to Goiás in late 2017, returning to the under-20s. He made his first team debut for the Esmeraldino on 20 March 2019, starting in a 2–1 home win against Iporá for the Goiano championship. His first goal came on 11 September, netting the opener in a 4–2 home success over Luverdense, for the year's Copa Verde.

On 22 August 2020, after being rarely used, Iago Mendonça was loaned to Série D side Aparecidense for the remainder of the season. He returned in October after failing to make an appearance, but still made his Série A debut on 3 December by starting in a 0–3 home loss against São Paulo.

Career statistics

References

External links
 Futebol de Goyaz profile 

1999 births
Living people
Sportspeople from Bahia
Brazilian footballers
Association football defenders
Campeonato Brasileiro Série A players
Trindade Atlético Clube players
Goiás Esporte Clube players
Associação Atlética Aparecidense players